Iván de la Peña López (born 6 May 1976) is a Spanish former professional footballer who played as a central midfielder. During his career, he earned the nicknames Pequeño Buddha (Little Buddha) and Lo Pelat (The Shaven One) due to his shaven head and slight frame.

Having started as a youth prodigy at Barcelona, he incidentally closed out his extensive career at neighbouring Espanyol, amassing La Liga totals of 269 games and 19 goals over the course of 12 seasons.

De la Peña was known for his technical skills and accurate passing ability, although his career was affected by several injuries.

Playing career

Club
Born in Santander, Cantabria, de la Peña was recruited by FC Barcelona as a youth player in 1991 and made his debut for the B-team two years later. He went on to play 37 games for them, and first-team manager Johan Cruyff gave him his official main squad debut on 3 September 1995 as he came on as a substitute – and scored – in a 2–0 away win against Real Valladolid; at 19 he was initially regarded as the natural successor to Pep Guardiola. However, he gradually fell out of favour with Cruyff and found himself dropped, although he achieved a career-best seven league goals in that rookie season.

With the arrival of Bobby Robson in 1996, de la Peña was given a second chance to establish himself in the team. He subsequently developed a partnership with Ronaldo and was a prominent member of the team that won the Copa del Rey/UEFA Cup Winners' Cup/UEFA Supercup treble in 1997. He was also voted the best young player by El País in both 1996 and 1997.

De la Peña fell out of favour at Barça once again after the arrival of another Dutch coach, Louis van Gaal, and he was consequently transferred to S.S. Lazio, along with Fernando Couto. However, he failed to establish himself in Serie A and was loaned to Olympique de Marseille during the 1999–00 season. This move was not successful either and he returned to Barcelona, on loan, for 2000–01; after only appearing nine times (one start, against Racing de Santander) throughout the season, under Lorenzo Serra Ferrer, he returned to Italy, being released in the following summer.

In 2002, de la Peña moved to Barcelona neighbours RCD Espanyol, where he gained the continuity and stability to produce some of the best football in his career. In 2004–05 he helped the Catalans finish fifth in La Liga, enabling them to qualify for the UEFA Cup. In the 2006 domestic cup final, de la Peña masterminded a 4–1 victory against Real Zaragoza, setting up two goals: Raúl Tamudo scored after two minutes when he headed in a rebound following a de la Peña free-kick. The pair combined again to carve open the Zaragoza defence to lay on a goal for Luis García; as a result, Espanyol again for the qualified for the UEFA Cup and eventually reached the competition final, losing to Sevilla FC on penalties.

From 2007 to 2009, after extending his contract, de la Peña was severely hindered with injury problems. However, on 21 February 2009, he managed to net twice in a 2–1 derby win at Barça, with one side ranking first in the league and the other last; Espanyol eventually finished in 10th position.

After the shocking death of new team captain Daniel Jarque, in August 2009, de la Peña was named as his replacement. His physical problems continued to bother him tremendously, to a point which he said that if this became a major issue he would retire, which happened on 22 May 2011 at the age of 35, immediately after a home match against Sevilla.

International
De la Peña, alongside the likes of Gaizka Mendieta, Fernando Morientes and Raúl, played for the Spanish under-21s at both the 1996 UEFA European Championship and the 1996 Summer Olympics, helping the nation reach the quarter-finals in the latter.

Despite this, he did not make his debut for the senior team until 9 February 2005, at the age of 28 years and 9 months in a 2006 FIFA World Cup qualifier against San Marino (Almería, 5–0). He subsequently played for Spain on five occasions during the year, with his last coming against the same opponent.

Post-retirement
On 8 June 2011, de la Peña was announced as part of the new coaching staff that would work alongside new manager Luis Enrique – a former teammate at Barcelona – at Serie A club A.S. Roma.
It was announced in August that he would be taking a leave of absence for family reasons.
Currently he works as a football agent, and his most known client that he represents is young FC Barcelona talent Gavi.

Career statistics

Club
Source:

International

Honours

Club
Barcelona
La Liga: 1997–98
Copa del Rey: 1996–97, 1997–98
Supercopa de España: 1996
UEFA Cup Winners' Cup: 1996–97
UEFA Super Cup: 1997

Lazio
Supercoppa Italiana: 1998
UEFA Cup Winners' Cup: 1998–99

Espanyol
Copa del Rey: 2005–06
UEFA Cup: Runner-up 2006–07

International
Spain
UEFA European Under-21 Championship: Runner-up 1996

Individual
Don Balón Award – Breakthrough Player of the Year in La Liga: 1995–96

References

External links

 
 
 
 

1976 births
Living people
Spanish footballers
Footballers from Santander, Spain
Association football midfielders
La Liga players
Segunda División players
FC Barcelona Atlètic players
FC Barcelona players
RCD Espanyol footballers
Serie A players
S.S. Lazio players
Ligue 1 players
Olympique de Marseille players
Spain youth international footballers
Spain under-21 international footballers
Spain under-23 international footballers
Spain international footballers
Footballers at the 1996 Summer Olympics
Olympic footballers of Spain
Spanish expatriate footballers
Expatriate footballers in Italy
Expatriate footballers in France
Spanish expatriate sportspeople in Italy
Spanish expatriate sportspeople in France